This is a list of places in Northern Ireland.

Settlements
List of towns and villages in Northern Ireland
List of cities in the United Kingdom#List of cities, sortable for Northern Ireland
List of localities in Northern Ireland by population

Subdivisions
List of districts
by area
by population
by population density
by community make-up
List of parliamentary constituencies
List of baronies of Northern Ireland

Natural features
List of Hewitts in Northern Ireland
List of Marilyns in Northern Ireland
List of nature reserves in Northern Ireland
List of parks in Northern Ireland
List of Ramsar sites in Northern Ireland
List of Special Areas of Conservation in Northern Ireland
List of Areas of Special Scientific Interest in Northern Ireland

County-specific lists

Antrim
List of places in County Antrim
List of civil parishes of County Antrim
List of townlands in County Antrim

Armagh
List of places in County Armagh
List of civil parishes of County Armagh
List of townlands in County Armagh

Down
List of places in County Down
List of civil parishes of County Down
List of townlands in County Down

Fermanagh
List of places in County Fermanagh 
List of civil parishes of County Fermanagh
List of townlands in County Fermanagh

Londonderry
List of places in County Londonderry
List of civil parishes of County Londonderry
List of townlands in County Londonderry

Tyrone
List of places in County Tyrone
List of civil parishes of County Tyrone
List of townlands in County Tyrone

See also
List of places in Ireland
:Category:Northern Ireland-related lists